Classic Six is a six-room apartment floor plan found in buildings built in New York City prior to 1940. It consists of a formal dining room, a living room, a kitchen, two bedrooms, a smaller bedroom sometimes referred to as a maid's room, and one or two bathrooms. A maid's room is located away from other bedrooms, almost always off the kitchen to allow maids of the past easy access. A typical maid's room also has a small bathroom attached to it.

The Classic Six is similar to the Classic Seven with the Classic Seven having an extra bedroom.

References 

Apartment types